Kaci Walfall (born 2004) is an American actress known for playing the titular role in Naomi.

Early life 
Walfall was born June 20, 2004 in Brooklyn, New York.

Career 
Walfall began pursuing acting seriously at age 7. made her broadway debut in The Lion King when she was 9. At age 11, she originated the role of Lavender in the first American national tour of Mathilda the Musical. In 2021, it was announced that Walfall would play Naomi McDuffie in the television show, Naomi based on the 2019 DC comics of the same name. Production began later that year. Naomi premiered on The CW in January 2022. The show was cancelled later that year after one season.

In 2022, it was announced that Walfall will appear in the final season of Queen Sugar.

Filmography

Television

Theatre

References

External links 

American stage actresses
American television actresses
Television child actresses
2004 births
Living people
People from Brooklyn
21st-century American actresses
African-American actresses
21st-century African-American women
Actresses from New York City